Suvarna Purushan is a 2018 Indian Malayalam-language film written and directed by Sunil Puveily and starring Innocent, Sreejith Ravi, Bijukuttan, and Lena. The principal photography took place at Irinjalakuda, Kerala.

Synopsis
The film tells the story of Rappayi, a theatre operator and a Mohanlal fan in Irinjalakuda as he leaves his work on the release day of Mohanlal-starring Pulimurugan in his theatre, Mary Matha.

Cast
 Innocent as Rappayi
 Lena as Deepa Pradeep
 Sreejith Ravi as Rappayi's assistant
 Bijukuttan
 Sasi Kalinga as Canteen Kumaran
 Anjali Ameer
 Manu
 Sunil Sukhada
 Pradeep Kottayam
 Sinoj Varghese
 Sam Mohan
 Jijoy Rajagopal

Production
Suvarna Purushan is the directorial debut of Sunil Puveily. Innocent plays the lead role of Rappayi, a hardcore Mohanlal fan. Rappayi works in a fictional theatre named Mary Matha. The film is a take on peoples admiration towards actor Mohanlal. Puveily who had previously directed documentary films initially thought of making Suvarna Purushan as a documentary film. It was completely filmed in and around Irinjalakuda, Kerala.

References

External links
 
 

2018 films
2010s Malayalam-language films
Indian comedy films
Films shot in Thrissur
2018 comedy films